Kim Sung-bae (born 10 October 1948) is a South Korean former professional tennis player.
 
A member of the South Korea Davis Cup team in the 1970s, Kim featured in a total of six ties and secured his most famous win over Japan's Jun Kamiwazumi. He was the Korean national champion in 1971 and 1973. His career included main draw appearances at both the French Open and Wimbledon.

Kim became South Korea's national coach in the 1980s and has also worked as a television commentator.

See also
List of South Korea Davis Cup team representatives

References

External links
 
 
 

1948 births
Living people
South Korean male tennis players
South Korean sports commentators